Nose ring may refer to:

 A nose ring in humans is also known as a nose piercing, including:
Nose-jewel, associated with the Indian subcontinent and mentioned in the Bible
Mola (art form), a cultural practice featuring nose rings
A sign of a Meghwal woman's marital status;  see Meghwal
A part of a Sikh wedding ceremony;  see Anand Karaj
 Nose ring (animals)
A part of a traditional fish trap;  see Putcher fishing